The 2005 European Junior and U23 Canoe Slalom Championships took place in Kraków, Poland from 18 to 21 August 2005 under the auspices of the European Canoe Association (ECA) at the Kraków-Kolna Canoe Slalom Course. It was the 7th edition of the competition for Juniors (U18) and the 3rd edition for the Under 23 category. A total of 16 medal events took place.

Medal summary

Men

Canoe

Junior

U23

Kayak

Junior

U23

Women

Kayak

Junior

U23

Medal table

References

External links
European Canoe Association

European Junior and U23 Canoe Slalom Championships
European Junior and U23 Canoe Slalom Championships
European Junior and U23 Canoe Slalom Championships
European Junior and U23 Canoe Slalom Championships
21st century in Kraków